An amenity area is a type of New Zealand protected area.

Under the Conservation Act 1987, designated Amenity Areas must legally be managed so:
 its indigenous natural resources and its historic resources are protected
 it contributes to and allow for people to appreciate its indigenous natural resources and its historic resources
 it fosters the recreational features of the area.

Land Information New Zealand lists 16 amenity areas on its website, all in the West Coast Region:

 Lake Hanlon Amenity Area
 Inangahua West Amenity Area
 Waiuta Amenity Area
 Craigieburn Amenity Area
 Ahaura Road Amenity Area
 Nelson Creek Amenity Area
 Ahaura River East Amenity Area
 Lake Hochstetter Amenity Area
 Lake Ahaura Amenity Area
 Lake Haupiri Amenity Area
 Woods Creek Amenity Area
 Revell Terrace Amenity Area
 Three Mile Amenity Area
 Dillmanstown Amenity Area
 Shamrock Creek Amenity Area
 Milltown Amenity Area

References

Protected areas of New Zealand
Lists of tourist attractions in New Zealand
New Zealand environment-related lists